Hanvec is a commune in the Finistère department of Brittany in northwestern France.

Population
Inhabitants of Hanvec are called in French Hanvécois.

See also
Communes of the Finistère department
Parc naturel régional d'Armorique

References

External links

Official website 

Mayors of Finistère Association 

Communes of Finistère